The following is a List of defunct universities and colleges in Kansas.  This list includes accredited, degree-granting institutions and bona fide institutions of higher learning that operated before accreditation existed. All have hosted their primary campus within the state of Kansas, and all have since discontinued operations or their operations were taken over by another similar institution of higher learning.

List details

Time of operation

Length of operation
Eight of the schools operated for more than 50 years. Brown Mackie College was able to function for 125 years before closing.  The shortest length of operation was less than two years by Bethel Bible College (1900–1901), followed by three years for Concordia Normal School (1874–1876).  At least four of the schools began operations before Kansas was admitted into the union (January 29, 1861).

Records for several of the schools have yet to be located and verified at this time of this writing to accurately determine how long the schools operated.

One school, Garfield University, actually opened and closed its doors twice.

Earliest and latest
The earliest verified to open was St. Mary's College in 1848, while the most recent to open was The Way College of Emporia in 1975.  The earliest on record to close was Blue Mont Central College in 1863.  The most recent four-year college closure was St. Mary of the Plains College in 1992.  The most recent two-year programs to close are Wright Career College in 2016 and Brown Mackie College in 2017.

University vs college/school
Of the 64 institutes on the list, each chose a different method of naming itself:
 45 took the name "college"
 6 claimed "university" in their title
 6 named themselves a "school"
 2 were called a "seminary"
 2 were "conservatories"
 1 was an "institute"
 1 did not have any such name in its title (Mount St. Scholastica) but was considered a "college"

Name considerations and locations
Three of the schools have some variation of "Saint Mary" in the name of the school:  St. Mary's College, St. Mary of the Plains College, and Marymount.  This can become even more confusing because there are two active colleges/universities in Kansas that have some variation of "Saint Mary" in their names: University of Saint Mary (Leavenworth) and St. Mary's College (St. Marys), the latter which is at the same location of one of the previous "Saint Mary" colleges.

Also in the same location and with similar names were The College of Emporia and The Way College of Emporia.  The first school ceased operations and then sold the grounds to The Way International, which operated a school afterward.  Critics accused the second school of attempting to use the history of the first to give a perception of value and credibility on the second.

Other colleges with similar names include the several normal schools and business colleges.  The College of the Sisters of Bethany is somewhat similar in name but otherwise unrelated to Bethany College in Lindsborg.

Aside from the two Emporia colleges, schools that shared locations were the former Kansas Technical Institute and the current Kansas State University – Salina; the site for Garfield University later became Friends University; and St. John's College was located just a few blocks from Southwestern College.  Other schools may also have shared property/buildings during location and relocation efforts during closing of the schools.

One school relocated outside of the state:  Midland College originated in Atchison and then relocated to Wahoo, Nebraska where it eventually merged with other schools.

Athletic programs
See List of college athletic programs in Kansas
Several of the schools maintained active athletic programs during their time of operation.

Included exceptions
There are a few inclusions in the list that are exceptions to the inclusion rule—most noticeably Utopia College.  Utopia did not grant "degrees" but operated as a "college" for an extended period of time.  Also, there are multiple business colleges that may not have been considered degree-granting institutions.  In the interest of being as complete as possible, such schools are listed.

Defunct colleges and universities in Kansas
This list may be incomplete.  You can help Wikipedia by expanding it.

See also 
 List of colleges and universities in Kansas
 List of college athletic programs in Kansas
 List of high schools in Kansas

References

Kansas
Kansas
Defunct